In a Child's Name is a four-hour mini-series televised on CBS in 1991.  Baby Andrew's mother was murdered by his father and a custody battle ensues between the father's parents and the mother's sister played by Valerie Bertinelli.

Plot
Ken Taylor (Michael Ontkean) lives in New Jersey and is a dentist in Staten Island, NY.  He marries Teresa Silvano. On their honeymoon, Teresa is mysteriously beaten within an inch of her life.  At the hospital, she tells her sister that she cannot remember what happened and that Ken did not beat her.

Ken's partners kick him out of his dental office partnership for stealing money from the vault(Ken might have an addiction to cocaine).  Teresa gives birth to their boy named Andrew. Ken murders Teresa and puts her body in the trunk of his car. He drives Andrew and the dead body to Indiana to give physical custody of Andrew to his parents. On the way back to New Jersey, Ken abandons the body in Pennsylvania. He calls Teresa's sister Angela Cimarelli (Valerie Bertinelli) and tells her that Teresa is a drug addict and that she is in a drug rehab center.

The police eventually finds the dead body and arrests Ken, who is found guilty of murder. His parents and Angela share custody of Andrew for a while. Ken's parents tried to legally adopt Andrew, but the state of Indiana declares the adoption void. Angela and her husband Jerry Cimarelli (Christopher Meloni) gain full parental custody of Andrew within a four year time span.

The movie was based on a true story.

Cast
 Valerie Bertinelli as Angela Silvano-Cimarelli
 Christopher Meloni as Jerry Cimarelli
 Michael Ontkean as Ken Taylor
 Timothy Carhart as Lieutenant Robert Fausak
 David Huddleston as Zach Taylor
 Louise Fletcher as Jean Taylor
 John Karlen as Joe Silvano
 Joanna Merlin as Frances Silvano
 Karla Tamburrelli as Teresa Silvano-Taylor
 Andy Hirsch as Andrew Silvano
 Eric Tilley as Tom Taylor
 Nancy McLoughlin as Marilyn Taylor
 Vincent Guastaferro as Malinouski
 Mitchell Ryan as Peter Chappell
 Caroline Kava as Janice Miller
 Randal Patrick as Ray Engler
 Jeff Allin as Edward Lindsay
 Dennis Cockrum as Gregg Reid
 Lou Criscuolo as Peter Maas
 Amy Lord as Karen Oliveria
 Rick Warner as Carl Stampler
 Caroline Dollar as Astrid
 Frank Hoyt Taylor as Reverend John Hickman
 Sam Vlahos as Dr. Vargas
 C.K. Bibby as Dr. Longwell
 Robert C. Treveiler as Dr. Kingston
 Bob Tyson as Dr. Hill
 Mark Joy as Lawyer Norton
 Tom Mason as Judge Shipp
 Mert Hatfield as Judge Pendleton
 Terry Loughlin as Judge Neuwirth
 Linda Pierce as Judge Skinner
 John Bennes as Judge Myrick
 Susan Rohrer as Judge Langdon
 Randell Haynes as Judge Kittleston
 Alma Martinez as Sorayda (uncredited)
 James Cromwell as Official (uncredited)

References

External links
 

1991 television films
1991 films
films set in New Jersey
films set in New York City
films set in Indiana